James Edmund Scripps (March 19, 1835 – May 28, 1906) was an American newspaper publisher and philanthropist.

Early life and education
Scripps was born in 1835 in London to James Mogg Scripps and Ellen Mary (Saunders) Scripps. His father was a bookbinder who came to America in 1844 with six motherless children. Scripps grew up on a Rushville, Illinois, farm.

Career

Scripps was employed at the Chicago Tribune in 1857 but moved to Detroit in 1859. By 1862 he had become manager of the Detroit Tribune, and he later became part owner and manager of the Detroit Daily Advertiser.
When the Advertiser'''s premises burned in 1873, Scripps took his $20,000 insurance money and with it started his own newspaper. Scripps decided to tap the growing literate class of working men and women by launching a newspaper, The Evening News (later, The Detroit News). Running with an idea new for its time, he filled the paper with inexpensive advertising and instructed his reporters to write "like people talk". His competitors called the News "a cheap rag" and labeled his reporters "pirates", but Detroiters loved it.

Scripps later had an interest in E. W. Scripps Company with his younger half-brother, E. W. Scripps and they controlled newspapers located in Cleveland, St. Louis, Cincinnati and Chicago.

After a lengthy European acquisition tour, Scripps aided prominently in founding the Detroit Museum of Art (later, the Detroit Institute of Arts), in 1889 presenting it with a collection of old masters such as Cima da Conegliano's Madonna and Child, costing $75,000 (in 1889 dollars), among the first major accessions of early paintings for any American museum. A catalogue of the collection was published in 1889 and has been digitized by the Research Library & Archives of the Detroit Institute of Arts.

In 1900, Scripps wrote a letter for the Detroit Century Box time capsule.

Family life
Scripps's sister and one-time partner Ellen Browning Scripps was instrumental in helping establish their younger brother E. W. Scripps in the newspaper industry, resulting in the E.W. Scripps Company media conglomerate. She later became the founding donor of the Scripps Institute of Oceanography located in La Jolla, California and was the founder of Scripps College, located in Claremont.

Scripps's eldest daughter, Ellen Warren Scripps (1863–1948), married George Gough Booth, who subsequently became the publisher of the Evening News Association and independently founded Michigan's Booth Newspapers chain (acquired by S.I. Newhouse's Advance Publications in 1976). Together, George and "Nellie" also founded the world-renowned Cranbrook Educational Community in Bloomfield Hills, Michigan.

Death
Scripps died in 1906 and is buried in Detroit's Woodmere Cemetery.

Books
 Five Months Abroad (1881)
 Memorials of the Scripps Family (1891)
 A Genealogical History of the Scripps Family and its Various Alliances'' (Detroit: privately printed, 1903)
 numerous pamphlets

References

Sources

External links

 Detnews.com: official website of The Detroit News
Freep.com: History of The Detroit News

American newspaper founders
Philanthropists from Illinois
1835 births
1906 deaths
James E.
The Detroit News people
American male journalists
Businesspeople from Detroit
Journalists from Michigan
Philanthropists from Michigan
People associated with the Detroit Institute of Arts
19th-century American journalists
19th-century American newspaper founders
19th-century American newspaper publishers (people)
People from Rushville, Illinois
British emigrants to the United States